Maurice Evans McLoughlin (January 7, 1890 – December 10, 1957) was an American tennis player. Known for his powerful serve, overhead, and volley, McLoughlin was the first male tennis champion from the western United States.

Biography
He was born on January 7, 1890, in Carson City, Nevada.

At the U.S. Championships, he won the singles twice, 1912  and 1913, and the doubles three times with Thomas Bundy, 1912-1914. In 1913 he also became the first American to be a finalist in the singles at Wimbledon when he defeated Stanley Doust in the final of the All-Comers tournament. He lost the Challenge Round in straight sets to defending champion Anthony Wilding.

The "California Comet" was the World No. 1 player for 1914. He married Helen Mears in 1918 and they had three children.

He died on December 10, 1957, in Hermosa Beach, California.

Legacy
In 1915, McLoughlin published an instructional tennis book titled Tennis as I Play It, ghostwritten by Sinclair Lewis.

McLoughlin was inducted into the International Tennis Hall of Fame in Newport, Rhode Island in 1957.

Grand Slam finals

Singles: (2 titles, 4 runner-up)

Doubles (3 titles, 2 runner-ups)

References

External links

 
 
 
 

1890 births
1957 deaths
American male tennis players
People from Carson City, Nevada
People from Hermosa Beach, California
International Tennis Hall of Fame inductees
Tennis people from California
Tennis people from Nevada
United States National champions (tennis)
Grand Slam (tennis) champions in men's singles
Grand Slam (tennis) champions in men's doubles
World number 1 ranked male tennis players